No Hard Feelings is an upcoming American coming of age sex comedy film directed by Gene Stupnitsky from a screenplay he co-wrote with John Phillips. Jennifer Lawrence produces and stars alongside Andrew Barth Feldman. Appearing in supporting roles are Matthew Broderick, Laura Benanti, Natalie Morales, Scott MacArthur and Ebon Moss-Bachrach.

No Hard Feelings is scheduled to be released in the United States on June 23, 2023, by Sony Pictures Releasing.

Premise
The film is set in Montauk, New York, where Maddie, a delivery driver, desperate for cash and facing bankruptcy after her car is repossessed, accepts a Craigslist posting from two parents who fear that their son, who is a very strange boy, is becoming a recluse. In exchange for a new car, she agrees to become the son's "girlfriend" and help him come into his own as a man.

Cast
 Jennifer Lawrence as Maddie
 Andrew Barth Feldman as Percy
 Matthew Broderick as Percy's father
 Laura Benanti as Percy's mother
 Natalie Morales as a friend of Maddie
 Scott MacArthur as a friend of Maddie
 Ebon Moss-Bachrach as Gary
 Hasan Minhaj
 Kyle Mooney

Production
In October 2021, it was announced that Sony won a highly competitive R-rated comedy package backed by producer-star Jennifer Lawrence and director Gene Stupnitsky over studios Apple, Netflix, and Universal Pictures for a theatrical-exclusive release.   Lawrence, Alex Saks, Marc Provissiero, Naomi Odenkirk, and Justine Polsky serve as producers while Stupnitsky co-wrote the screenplay with John Phillips. In July 2022, it was reported that Sony would be moving forward with the film and engage in a theatrical release set for June 16, 2023. 

In September 2022, Andrew Barth Feldman joined the cast as the male lead, while Laura Benanti and Matthew Broderick were cast as that character's parents; Ebon Moss-Bachrach also joined the cast. In October 2022, Natalie Morales and Scott MacArthur joined the cast.

Principal photography began in late September 2022 in various Nassau County locations in New York, such as Hempstead, Point Lookout, Lawrence, and Uniondale. Ted's Fishing Station located in Point Lookout was made to look like "Montauk Dock East".   In October, production shot scenes at the North Shore Animal League America in Port Washington.

Release 
No Hard Feelings is set for release in the United States on June 23, 2023. It was initially scheduled to be released the week before (June 16, 2023).

Marketing
The marketing campaign for No Hard Feelings began on March 6, 2023 when stunt advertisements reading "NEED A CAR? 'DATE' OUR SON" were released on billboards and newsstands across the United States, as well as social platforms such Instagram, Reddit and Facebook. A trailer for the film—which addresses the advertisements—was released to the public on March 9, 2023.

References

External links
 
 
 
 

2020s American films
American coming-of-age comedy films
American sex comedy films
American teen comedy films
Columbia Pictures films
Films directed by Gene Stupnitsky
Films with screenplays by Gene Stupnitsky
Films set in New York (state)
Films shot in New York (state)
Sony Pictures films